The following is a list of members of the United States House of Representatives from the Commonwealth of Pennsylvania. For chronological tables of members of both houses of the United States Congress from the state (through the present day), see United States congressional delegations from Pennsylvania. The list has been updated periodically to reflect changes in membership; current entries are for members of the 118th Congress.

Current members 
Listed below are the incumbent members of the Pennsylvania House Delegation to the 118th Congress, updated in January of 2023 
 : Brian Fitzpatrick (R) (since 2017)
 : Brendan Boyle (D) (since 2015)
 : Dwight Evans (D) (since 2016)
 : Madeleine Dean (D) (since 2019)
 : Mary Gay Scanlon (D) (since 2018)
 : Chrissy Houlahan (D) (since 2019)
 : Susan Wild (D) (since 2018)
 : Matt Cartwright (D) (since 2013)
 : Dan Meuser (R) (since 2019)
 : Scott Perry (R) (since 2013)
 : Lloyd Smucker (R) (since 2017)
 : Summer Lee (D) (since 2023)
 : John Joyce (R) (since 2019)
 : Guy Reschenthaler (R) (since 2019)
 : Glenn Thompson (R) (since 2009)
 : Mike Kelly (R) (since 2011)
 : Chris Deluzio (D) (since 2023)

List of members

See also

List of United States senators from Pennsylvania
United States congressional delegations from Pennsylvania
Pennsylvania's congressional districts

References

Sources
 House of Representatives List of Members

List
Articles with hCards
Pennsylvania
United States Rep